Marco Bernal (born 2 May 1962) is a Colombian athlete in dressage. He competed at several Pan-American Games where he won team bronze in 2011 and team silver in 1999. In 2010 Bernal was gold medalled at the Central American Games in Mayagüez, Puerto Rico. The same year he represented Colombia at the 2010 FEI World Equestrian Games in Lexington, Kentucky.

Bernal was the first Latin American who successfully graduated from the prestigious German riding school in Warendorf and was the first Colombian who competed at the World Cup Finals in Dressage, in Las Vegas 2009, where he received a wildcard from the FEI.

References

1962 births
Colombian male equestrians
Colombian dressage riders
Living people
Equestrians at the 2015 Pan American Games
Equestrians at the 2011 Pan American Games
Pan American Games silver medalists for Colombia
Pan American Games bronze medalists for Colombia
Pan American Games medalists in equestrian
Medalists at the 1999 Pan American Games
20th-century Colombian people
21st-century Colombian people